Gotzone Mora (b. Bilbao in 1948) is a Spanish social-democratic politician.  She was a member of the 
Basque Socialist Party ("Euskadiko Alderdi Sozialista – Euskadiko Ezkerra" / "Partido Socialista de Euskadi – Euskadiko Ezkerra"/ PSE-EE) till March 2008 when she was expelled from it for advocating support for the People's Party.  Since 2008 she has been a member of the People's Party ("Partido Popular" / PP).

Of humble origins, she has become knowledgeable on human migration and global social processes. She has been a sociology reader in the University of the Basque Country in Spain.

She was an elected member of the Getxo municipality (Biscay) until 2007, and is currently a member of the intellectual group Foro Ermua (the Ermua Forum) and Democratic Citizenship.

Due to her critical position towards the social policy of the leader of her party she has a banishment expedient waiting for resolution (2006). She has been targeted by the violent separatist organisation ETA. She has to attend her classes in the university escorted by bodyguards. She gives conferences to explain her beliefs about the current political situation in Spain.

See also 
Politics of Spain

References 

1948 births
Living people
People from Bilbao
Spanish Socialist Workers' Party politicians
Spanish women sociologists
Recipients of the Order of Constitutional Merit
Academic staff of the University of the Basque Country
21st-century Spanish politicians
21st-century Spanish women politicians